This is a list of youth councils around the world.

Youth councils

 Youth voice
 Youth politics

References